This is a list of English determiners.

Alphabetical List (excluding numerals above three) 

 a
 a few
 a little
 all
 an
 another
 any
 anybody
 anyone
 anything
 anywhere
 both
 certain (also adjective)
 each
 either
 enough
 every
 everybody
 everyone
 everything
 everywhere
 few
 fewer
 fewest

 last (also adjective)
 least
 less (also adverb and preposition)
 little (also adjective)
 many
 many a
 more (also adverb)
 most (also adverb)
 much
 neither
 next (also adjective)
 no (also interjection)
 no one
 nobody
 none
 nothing
 nowhere
 once
 one (also noun and pronoun)
 said (also verb)
 several (also adjective)
 some

 somebody
 something
 somewhere
 sufficient (also adjective)
 that
 the
 these
 this
 those
 three (also noun)
 thrice
 twice
 two (also noun)
 us (also pronoun)
 various
 we (also pronoun)
 what (also pronoun and adjective)
 whatever
 which (also pronoun)
 whichever
 you (also pronoun)
 zero (also noun)
All cardinal numerals are also included.

Sub classifications from CGEL

Articles 

 a / an
 the

Demonstratives 

 that / those
 this / these

Personal determiners 

 we / us
 you
 them (In some dialects such as the Ozark dialect.)

Universal determiners 

 all
 both

Distributive determiners 

 each
 every

Existential determiners 

 any
 some

Cardinal numerals 

 zero
 one
 two
 three
 etc.

Disjunctive determiners 

 either
 neither

Negative determiners 

 no
 none

Alternative-additive determiner 

 another

Positive paucal determiners 

 a few
 a little
 several

Degree determiners 

 few / fewer / fewest
 little / less / least
 many / more / most
 much / more / most

Sufficiency determiners 

 enough
 sufficient

Temporal determiners 

 last
 next

Interrogative determiners 

 what
 whatever
 which
 whichever

Marginal determiners 

 certain
 said
 various

Relative determiners 

 what
 whatever
 which
 whichever

Compound determiners 

 a few, a little
 -body, -one, -thing, & -where
 anybody, anyone, anything, anywhere
 everybody, everyone, everything, everywhere
 nobody, no one, nothing, nowhere
 somebody, someone, something, somewhere
 once, twice, thrice
 one hundred, two thousand, three million, etc.
 many a
 whatever, whichever

Other grammars

Genitive

Pronouns 

 my, your, his, her, our, their
 its
 whose
 one's

Nouns 
Any genitive noun phrase such as the cat's, the cats''', Geoff's'', etc.

Predeterminers 

 half, a third, a quarter, etc.
 such, quite, rather
 twice, thrice
 both, all
 double, triple, quadruple, etc.

References 

Determiners
Lists of English words